Butyramide is the amide of butyric acid.  It has the molecular formula C3H7CONH2.  It is a white solid that is freely soluble in water and ethanol, but slightly soluble in diethyl ether. At room temperature, butyramide is a crystalline solid and in contrast to butyric acid, it is devoid of an unpleasant, rancid smell.

Synthesis  
Butyramide can be synthesized by:
 catalytic hydration of butyronitrile;
 reaction of butyryl chloride with ammonium salts;
 reduction of butyraldoxime.

Derivatives  
Some of its derivatives have shown preliminary strong anticonvulsive activity and inhibitory action on histone deacetylases, which are crucial enzymes controlling the proliferative or differentiation status of most cells.

See also
 Isobutyramide

References

 Jiang J et al. PLos One 2012; 7(3): e34283
 Liu WH et al. Yao Xue Xue Bao 2012 Feb; 47(2): 194-99.
 Vitorivic-Todorovic MD et al. Bioorg Med Chem 2010 Feb; 18(3): 1181-93.